Kengcheng or Keng Cheng (also known as Kyaingchaing and Chiang Khaeng) was one of the Shan states. In 1896, part of Keng Cheng was incorporated into the neighbouring state of Kengtung in what is today Burma, and the other part, which is now in Laos, went to French Indochina.

History
Kengcheng was a tributary state of the King of Burma until 1887, when the Shan states submitted to British rule after the fall of the Konbaung dynasty. The capital of Keng Cheng was at Muang Sing (now part of Laos).

In 1896, Kengcheng was divided between British Burma and French Indochina with the Mekong as a border. The districts of the Cis-Mekong part of the state were merged with Kengtung State and the eastern districts, now the Muang Sing area, went first to Siam and then to the French. The limit between Kengtung and China was demarcated by an Anglo-Chinese commission in 1898–1899.

Sir George Scott mentioned the following about the Keng Cheng Myosa:

Rulers

References

External links
The Tai Of The Shan State
Keng Cheng
The Imperial Gazetteer of India

Shan States